José Fernández Migoya (1900 – 11 July 1968) was a Cuban chess player. He was the winner of the Cuban Chess Championship in 1923. The national chess tournament Migoya In Memoriam, is named after him.  Migoya was born in 1900 in Pinar del Río and died on 11 July 1968 in Camagüey, Cuba.

References

Further reading 
 Jaque Mate, Jan–Feb 1975, cover d 

Cuban chess players
People from Pinar del Río
1900 births
1968 deaths